Abdul Haq Khan  is a Kashmiri politician, lawyer, and former Minister for Rural Development Department and Panchayati Raj and Law & Justice, Jammu and Kashmir under PDP-BJP coalition government. He was Member of Legislative Assembly representing Lolab constituency at the Jammu and Kashmir Legislative Assembly from January 2009 to November 2018. He is associated with Jammu and Kashmir Peoples Democratic Party.

Abdul Haq Khan was born in Diver Anderbugh village of Lolab Valley. He has studied B.A. LLB from Kashmir University which he completed in 1977.

In 2014 Assembly elections, Khan was elected for the second time by defeating Qaiser Jamsheed Lone of National Conference by a margin of 2870 votes.

Khan is a critic of the liquor trend in Kashmir.

On 6 January 2019 when his security was withdrawn by the Government, Khan blamed BJP for the same.

References

Living people
People from Srinagar
University of Kashmir alumni
People from Kupwara district
Jammu and Kashmir Peoples Democratic Party politicians
Kashmiri people
21st-century Indian politicians
1968 births